Shilansha (Kaitag: Шшиланшша) is a rural locality (a selo) in Kirkinsky Selsoviet, Kaytagsky District, Republic of Dagestan, Russia. The population was 82 as of 2010.

Geography 
Shilansha is located 33 km southwest of Madzhalis (the district's administrative centre) by road. Kirki and Turaga are the nearest rural localities.

Nationalities 
Dargins live there.

References 

Rural localities in Kaytagsky District